This is a list of cast members and characters from the British sitcom Benidorm, which aired from 2007 to 2018.

Main characters

Recurring characters

References

Benidorm
Benidorm (TV series)